Victor Zobnev (Russian: Виктор Викторович Зобнев; born 7 June 1964) is a Russian politician serving as a senator from the State Assembly of the Altai Republic since 7 October 2021.

Victor Zobnev is under personal sanctions introduced by the European Union, the United Kingdom, the USA, Canada, Switzerland, Australia, Ukraine, New Zealand, for ratifying the decisions of the "Treaty of Friendship, Cooperation and Mutual Assistance between the Russian Federation and the Donetsk People's Republic and between the Russian Federation and the Luhansk People's Republic" and providing political and economic support for Russia's annexation of Ukrainian territories.

Biography

Victor Zobnev was born on 7 June 1964 in Rubtsovsk, Altai Krai. In 1989, he graduated from the Altai State Technical University. From 1982 to 1984, Zobnev served in the Soviet Army. Afterwards, he engaged in private business and even became one of the founders of CJSC "Rubtsovsky Spare Parts Plant". On 2 March 2008, he was elected deputy of the Altai Krai Legislative Assembly of the 5th convocation. On 4 December 2011, he was re-elected. From 2016 to 2021, he was the deputy of the 7th State Duma from the United Russia party. On 7 October 2021, he became the senator from the State Assembly of the Altai Republic.

References

Living people
1964 births
United Russia politicians
21st-century Russian politicians
People from Rubtsovsk
Members of the Federation Council of Russia (after 2000)
Altai State Technical University alumni